Listed below are notable people from Uruguay.

Artists

Rodolfo Arotxarena
Pablo Atchugarry
José Belloni
Juan Manuel Blanes
Juan José Calandria
Carlos Capelán
Pedro Figari
Carlos María Herrera
Edward Johnston
Carlos Páez Vilaró
Virginia Patrone
María Carmen Portela
Hermenegildo Sábat
Martín Sastre
Felipe Seade
Joaquín Torres García
Daniel Pontet
Eduardo Vernazza

Vedettes, singers, actors, dancers and models

Alicia Alfonso (born 1963) actress
Marcelo Buquet actor and former model
César Campodónico actor
Eunice Castro fashion-runway model, professional theater dancer, television and runway hostess and actress of stage and screen
Mateo Chiarino (born 1983) actor, writer, and director
Mary da Cuña (1942–2016) actress and theater director
George DelHoyo American theater and television actor, born in Canelones
Virginia Dobrich professional theater and television dancer
Mónica Farro theatrical supervedette, model and professional theater and television actress
Tina Ferreira carnival and theater vedette, dancer and journalist
Delfi Galbiati theatre actor
Andrea Ghidone vedette, fashion model, professional dancer and actress of theater and television
Daniel Hendler film, television, and theatre actor
Osvaldo Laport film and television actor
Laura Martínez (born 1964) actress, dancer, television star
María Mendive (born 1968) actress and theater director
Mónica Mesones model and TV presenter
Bárbara Mori telenovela and film actress and model
Natalia Oreiro Latin Grammy-nominated singer, actress and fashion designer
María Padín (1888–1970) actress and producer
Pelusa Vera (born 1940) theater, radio, and television actress
Imilce Viñas (1939–2009) actress, comedian, teacher, and theater director
China Zorrilla award-winning theater, film and television actress

Musicians

Miguel del Aguila 
Jorge Drexler, Academy Award winner
Pablo Sciuto
José Serebrier
Alfredo Zitarrosa
Edgardo Cambón
Mariana Ingold
Martín López
Eduardo Mateo
Martín Méndez
Rubén Rada
Jaime Roos
Gabe Saporta
Erwin Schrott
Julio Sosa
Daniel Viglietti
Malena Muyala

Politics and military

Gregorio Álvarez
Juan José de Amézaga
Mariano Arana
Líber Arce (1938–1968), martyred student activist
José Gervasio Artigas
Danilo Astori
Alfredo Baldomir
Hugo Batalla
Jorge Batlle
José Batlle y Ordóñez
Lorenzo Batlle
Luis Batlle Berres
Tomas Berreta
Graciela Bianchi (born 1954), professor, politician, lawyer, notary
Eduardo Blanco Acevedo
Juan María Bordaberry
Pedro Bordaberry
Baltasar Brum
Lorenzo Carnelli
Juan Lindolfo Cuestas
José Eugenio Ellauri
Hugo Fernández Faingold
Venancio Flores
Emilio Frugoni
Reinaldo Gargano
Julio César Grauert
Héctor Gutiérrez Ruiz
Luis Alberto de Herrera
Luis Alberto Lacalle
Juan Antonio Lavalleja
Aparicio Méndez
Rafael Michelini
Zelmar Michelini
Martha Montaner (1955–2016), deputy and senator
José Mujica
Rodolfo Nin Novoa
Didier Opertti Badan
Manuel Oribe
Jorge Pacheco Areco
Susana Pintos (1939–1968), martyred student activist
Fructuoso Rivera
Julio María Sanguinetti
Aparicio Saravia
Raúl Sendic
Joaquín Suárez
Gabriel Terra
Tabaré Vázquez
Feliciano Viera

Religious leaders

Gonzalo Aemilius
Antonio María Barbieri
Pablo Galimberti
José Benito Lamas
Dámaso Antonio Larrañaga
Juan Francisco Larrobla
José Benito Monterroso
Francisca Rubatto
Juan Luis Segundo
Mariano Soler
Jacinto Vera

Writers

Eduardo Acevedo Díaz
Francisco Acuña de Figueroa
Delmira Agustini
Pilar Barrios
Mario Benedetti
Amanda Berenguer
Ruben Cotelo
Juana de Ibarbourou
Eduardo Galeano
Marosa di Giorgio
Julio Herrera y Reissig
Jorge Majfud
Eduardo Milán
Juan Carlos Onetti, Cervantes Prize winner
Emilio Oribe
Cristina Peri Rossi
Manuel Pérez y Curis
Horacio Quiroga
José Enrique Rodó
María Herminia Sabbia y Oribe
Florencio Sánchez
Maria Eugenia Vaz Ferreira
Idea Vilariño
Javier de Viana
Juan Zorrilla de San Martín

Film directors and screenwriters
 Fede Álvarez
 Valeria Puig
 Juan Pablo Rebella
 Pablo Stoll
 Rodo Sayagues

Public figures
Irma Avegno (1881–1913), businesswoman
Roberto Canessa
Mariana Mota, judge
Nando Parrado

Indigenous people
María Micaëla Guyunusa
Laureano Tacuavé Martínez

Engineers and architects

Eladio Dieste
Gonzalo Frasca
Roman Fresnedo Siri
Carlos Ott

Educators
Enriqueta Compte y Riqué (1866–1949), educational theorist
María Stagnero de Munar (1856–1922), educational reformer and feminist

Journalists
Susana Andrade (born 1963) – attorney, journalist, columnist, politician
Clara Berenbau (1980–2013) – presenter, announcer, columnist, actress, writer, and journalist
Jorge Gestoso Spanish-language television host and President of GTN, Gestoso Television News
Pedro Sevcec Spanish-language television news anchor for U.S. network Telemundo

Composers
Miguel del Aguila – (Grammy nominated classical composer)
Jorge Drexler Academy Award-winning song composer (The Motorcycle Diaries)
Gerardo Matos Rodríguez composer of the tango La Cumparsita
Guido Santórsola
Alfredo Zitarrosa

Scientists
Beatriz Álvarez Sanna (born 1968), biochemist
Rodrigo Arocena
José L. Duomarco
Erna Frins (born 1960), physicist
Rodolfo Gambini
Gaston Gonnet
Esmeralda Mallada (born 1937), astronomer
José Luis Massera
Mariana Meerhoff (born 1975), researcher, professor, and biologist
Mario Wschebor

Sports

Football

Sebastián Abreu ("El Loco Abreu") football player, member of national team
José Andrade former football player and member of the 1930 FIFA World Cup-winning team
Felipe Avenatti former football player
Julio César Benítez Amodeo Uruguayan football player, played seven seasons with Barcelona from 1961 to his sudden death in 1968
Edinson Cavani football player, member of national team and Manchester United
Héctor Codevila  footballer
César Falletti football player, forward
Diego Forlán former football player, member of national team
Enzo Francescoli former football player, member of national team
Alcides Ghiggia former football player, member of the 1950 FIFA World Cup-winning team
Diego Godín football player, member of national team and Cagliari
Wilson Graniolatti former football player
Carlos Grossmüller former football player
John Harley played with C.U.R.C.C./Peñarol from 1909 until his retirement from football in 1920
Luis Jonne former football player, member of national team
Gary Kagelmacher football player, defender 
Marcelo Lipatin football player, forward (Trofense)
Diego Lugano former football player, member of national team
Francisco Majewski former football player
Juan Masnik former football player
Ladislao Mazurkiewicz former football player
Hugo Modernell football player
Paolo Montero former football player, member of the national team
Fernando Muslera football player, member of national team and Galatasaray
José Nasazzi former football player, captain of the 1930 FIFA World Cup-winning team
Álvaro Recoba football player, member of the national team
Pedro Rocha former football player, member of the national team
Diego Rossi football player, forward
Juan Schiaffino former football player, member of the 1950 FIFA World Cup-winning team
Luis Suárez football player, member of national team and Atlético Madrid 
Obdulio Varela former football player, captain of the 1950 World Cup-winning team
Matías Vitkieviez former football player
Gerardo Vonder former football player

Others

Celia Barboza (born 1977) – surfing champion
Esteban Batista first Uruguayan to play in the National Basketball Association
Alfredo Evangelista boxer
José María Flores Burlón boxer
Marcel Felder (born 1984) tennis player
Emiliano Lasa, track and field athlete, Olympic finalist
Oscar Moglia Olympic medal-winning basketball player
Andy Ram (born 1980) – Uruguay-born Israeli tennis player
Uriel Trocki (born 1996) Uruguayan-Israeli basketball player for national team and in the Israeli Basketball Premier League
Milton Wynants Olympic silver medal-winning cyclist

Economists
Azucena Arbeleche (born 1970)economist, professor, and civil servant
Arturo C. Porzecanski Wall Street economist and university professor

See also
 Lists of people by nationality

References